Melatef Umeshaker is the debut album of the Israeli singer and musician Ivri Lider. "Melatef Umeshaker" means "Caressing and Lying" in Hebrew. It was produced by Yo'ad Nevo, and was released in 1997. Half a year later it was certified platinum with sales of over 40,000 copies.

Track listing
 "Kama Kokhav"          (How Much a Star)
 "Af Ekhad MiShneynu"   (Neither of the Two of Us)
 "Tamid Ahava"          (Always Love)
 "Leonardo"
 "Jacket"
 "Agadot"               (Tales)
 "Knafayim"             (Wings)
 "Melat'ef U'meshaqer"   (Caressing and Lying)
 "Mary LeNetzach"       (Mary Forever)
 "Isha Livyatan"       (A Whale Woman)
 "Yoter Midai Harbe"   (Too Much Plenty)
 "Ze T'ov"              (It's Good)

Hit Singles
"Leonardo"
"Tamid Ahava"

1997 debut albums
Ivri Lider albums